The following highways are numbered 451:

Canada
 Ontario Highway 451, commonly called the Queen Elizabeth Way.

Japan
 Japan National Route 451

Korea, South
 Jungbu Naeryuk Expressway Branch

United Kingdom
 from Stourbridge to Great Witley

United States
  Florida State Road 451
  Kentucky Route 451
  Louisiana Highway 451
  Maryland Route 451 (former)
  New Mexico State Road 451
  Oregon Route 451
  Puerto Rico Highway 451
  Tennessee State Route 451
 Texas
  Farm to Market Road 451
  Wyoming Highway 451